Stanley J. Kozlowski (February 25, 1924 – August 23, 1972) was an American football fullback in the All-America Football Conference for the Miami Seahawks.  He played college football at the University of Notre Dame and the College of the Holy Cross and was drafted in the third round of the 1946 NFL Draft by the Washington Redskins. In August 1972, he was walking across a street and was hit by a car. He died a few hours later at a hospital.

References

1924 births
1972 deaths
People from East Providence, Rhode Island
Players of American football from Rhode Island
American football fullbacks
Notre Dame Fighting Irish football players
North Carolina Pre-Flight Cloudbusters football players
Miami Seahawks players
Pedestrian road incident deaths
Road incident deaths in Massachusetts
Holy Cross Crusaders football players